Michael O'Donohue (1835 – December 19, 1912) was an Irish-American builder and architect  from Hartford, Connecticut who designed a number of ecclesiastical buildings in New England for both Roman Catholic and Jewish clients.

Early life and career
O'Donohue was born in 1835 Ireland and immigrated to America in 1872. Little is known of his life before his relocated to Hartford.

Architectural practice
In 1890 he moved to Hartford, Connecticut where he established an architectural practice under his own name. He carried on an active business as a designer of Catholic churches in the Gothic Revival style.
O'Donohue is one of the few architects of Catholic churches to have also built for non-Catholic clients as well.

He died at his home in Hartford on December 19, 1912.

Legacy
O'Donohue is not as significant a figure in 19th century American Catholic architecture as his fellow countrymen and contemporaries Patrick. C Keely, James Murphy, or Patrick W. Ford. Nonetheless his work is appreciated today and several of his buildings have been selected to National Registers.

Works

Connecticut
 Our Lady of Sorrows School, Hartford, Connecticut
 Ados Israel Synagogue, Hartford, Connecticut
 LaSalette Seminary, Hartford, Connecticut (Central portion of present building, wings added by O'Connell and Shaw)
 Former Immaculate Conception Church, Hartford, Connecticut
 St. Ann Church, Hartford, Connecticut (replaced by present building by Henry F. Ludorf)
 St. Anthony of Padua Church, Litchfield, Connecticut (burned 1944, replaced by Oliver Reagan)
 St. Mary Rectory, New Britain, Connecticut (church by Patrick. C. Keely)
 St. Mary Church, Union City, Connecticut
 Sacred Heart Church, Hartford, Connecticut (first church, later completed by George A. Zunner)
 St. Peter Church, New Britain, Connecticut
 St. Mary's Parochial School (1888 section) Windsor Locks, CT

New York
 St Francis DeSales Church, Phoenicia, New York

Rhode Island
 Unnamed church, Providence, Rhode Island

References

1835 births
1912 deaths
19th-century Irish people
Irish architects
Architects from Hartford, Connecticut
19th-century American architects
Irish emigrants to the United States (before 1923)
American ecclesiastical architects
Architects of Roman Catholic churches